The following is an incomplete list of fraternities and sororities in the Philippines.

Explanation of columns
 Name – the Greek letters spelled out in English or other long form name for the organization (ordered on this column)
 Symbols – the Greek letters or other similar abbreviations for the collegiate organization
 Chartered – the date of formation for the organization.
 Founding location - the location at which the first chapter of the organization was founded 
 Type – indicator of whether the group is a fraternity (males), sorority (females), linked fraternity and sorority (males and females), or a single organization allowing members of both genders (coed fraternity or coed sorority); Social social Greek organization, service fraternity, etc.
 Range – International (chapters both in and out of the Philippines), National (chapters across the Philippines), regional (a few chapters in the same district), and local (one chapter)
 Active chapters – number of active chapters in the Philippines only
 Affiliation – membership in organization of fraternities and / or sororities
 Registration  – indicates if the organization is registered with the Securities and Exchange Commission (Philippines).

General fraternities and sororities

Articles containing Ancient Greek (to 1453)-language text
Articles containing Ancient Greek (to 1453)-language text

Notes

Professional

Notes

References 

Student societies in the Philippines

Fraternities and sororities
Philippines